Kutzenhausen is a commune in the Bas-Rhin department in Grand Est in north-eastern France.

Twin towns
  Kutzenhausen, Bavaria since 1987.

List of mayors

See also
 Communes of the Bas-Rhin department

References

External links

Parc naturel régional des Vosges du Nord site

Communes of Bas-Rhin
Bas-Rhin communes articles needing translation from French Wikipedia